Shoobridge may refer to:

Leonard Shoobridge
The various members of the Tasmanian political family:
Ebenezer Shoobridge (1820–1901), member of the Tasmanian Legislative Council (1882–1886)
William Shoobridge (1846–1940), son of Ebenezer, member of the Tasmanian House of Assembly (1916–1919, 1922–1928, 1929–1931)
Vincent Shoobridge (1872–1948), son of William, member of the Tasmanian House of Assembly (1940–1941)
Louis Shoobridge Sr. (1851–1939), son of Ebenezer, member of the Tasmanian Legislative Council (1921–1937)
Rupert Shoobridge (1883–1962), son of Louis Sr., member of the Tasmanian Legislative Council (1937–1955)
Louis Shoobridge Jr. (1920–2005), son of Rupert, member of the Tasmanian Legislative Council (1968–1971)